Karen Gee (born 1973) is an Australian women fashion designer who is the founder of eponymous fashion label, Karen Gee.

Early life and family
Karen Gee was born as Karen Martin in 1973. After graduating from school, Gee attended St. Peters Lutheran College Brisbane. She completed her education from Harvard Business School.

Career
In 2011, Gee received a nomination for Mrs Australia; she accepted this challenge as this award mainly supports women and children in need and was followed by two charities, Women in Need Australia Foundation and the Project Dovetail Children's Organisation. Later on, she won the title of Mrs Australia Globe.

In 2013, Gee founded her eponymous fashion label.

In 2015, Gee opened her first store in Chifley. Following year, Gee was a finalist for Ausmumpreneur award.

In October 2018, Meghan, Duchess of Sussex, wore one of her designed dresses.

Her designs have been worn by notable personalities such as Melissa Doyle, Lisa Wilkinson, Sonia Kruger, Sylvia Jeffreys, Meghan Markle, Rebel Wilson, Bethenny Frankel, and Gladys Berejiklian.

Awards and recognition
 Title of Mrs Australia (2012)

References

Australian fashion designers
Australian women fashion designers
Harvard Business School alumni
1973 births
Living people